Chippa United Football Club (often known as Chilli boys or Chippa) is a South African professional football club based in Gqeberha in the Eastern Cape province, having previously being based in Nyanga suburb of the city of Cape Town. The club's first team currently plays in the Premier Soccer League's Premier Division, with the reserve team playing in the PSL's reserve league. The team plays most of its home games at the  Nelson Mandela Bay Stadium, while hosting other matches at East London's Sisa Dukashe Stadium.

History
The club was founded in January 2010 when Chippa Mpengesi purchased the Vodacom League franchise of Paarl based club, Mbekweni Cosmos, for R400,000. Cosmos had won promotion from the Castle League at the end of the 2008–09 season, and started campaigning in the Vodacom League in the 2009–10 season. In 2010–11 season, the club began playing under the name, Chippa United.

Chippa United's first season was very successful with the club winning the Western Cape Vodacom League before winning the Vodacom League National Coastal Stream to achieve promotion to the National First Division. Chippa were also crowned the overall 2010–11 Vodacom League National champions after beating Inland Stream winners Sivutsa Stars.

The club finished their debut season in the National First Division in 2nd place behind University of Pretoria and won promotion to the Premier Soccer League via the play-offs in June 2012. Chippa used five managers during the course of the 2012–13 PSL season and finished 15th, eventually getting relegated after failing to win the playoffs.

A feeder team, called Peace Makers, was once owned by Chippa United, and ran teams under the club's umbrella. It ran a team in the SAFA Second Division and also junior teams in Cape Town's junior leagues. The Peace Makers franchise was sold to Milano United before the beginning of the 2013–14 season. In Port Elizabeth the club runs its youth teams under the Chippa United name, and play in the Port Elizabeth Football Association leagues.

Ownership
Chippa United is wholly owned by Chippa Investment Holdings, which is a Cape Town-based construction, security and cleaning company founded by Siviwe "Chippa" Mpengesi.

During 2015, the club was effectively under the administration of Access Facilities and Leisure Management, the operating company of Nelson Mandela Bay Stadium.

Stadium
During the club's early seasons in Cape Town, it used Philippi Stadium as its home ground. The stadium was used from 2009–10 to 2011–12 and again in 2013–14.

Following the 2011–12 the club was promoted from the Premier Soccer League's National First Division to the Premier Division. Philippi Stadium was deemed not to be up to standard to host matches in the Premier Division. Due to this, the club hosted its matches at Athlone Stadium and Cape Town Stadium. However, the ground had previously been used by Vasco da Gama during the 2010–11 season. From March 2013, the club was allowed to host matches at Philippi Stadium.

Following the 2013–14 season the club was promoted to the Premier Division once more. During the off season, the club announced that it would move to Port Elizabeth. The club and municipality announced a three-year deal to use Nelson Mandela Bay Stadium. The municipality also announced that certain matches would be played at the city's Wolfson Stadium and Gelvandale Stadium. During the 2014–15 season, the club was forced to host matches at the Wolfson Stadium.

According to a report tabled by the Nelson Mandela Bay mayor's office, Chippa United's contract to play in the city is for 18 years, beginning with the 2014–15 season, and thus running to 2031–32.

During the 2015–16 season, the club announced plans to host some of its matches at East London's Buffalo City Stadium. The club cited the high cost of hosting matches at the Nelson Mandela Bay Stadium, and lack of paying spectators as reasons for the decision.

Training ground
On the club's movement to Port Elizabeth, it announced that it intended to use Wolfson Stadium as its training ground, and intended pursuing a long-term lease from the Nelson Mandela Bay Metropolitan Municipality. As the ground was not yet up to standard, the club announced that it would use Gelvandale Stadium for training, until the necessary upgrades were completed at Wolfson Stadium. During the 2014–15 and 2015–16 seasons, the club split its training at Nelson Mandela Metropolitan University's Second Avenue Campus and Nelson Mandela Bay Stadium's outdoor fields. Nelson Mandela Bay Stadium's outer fields are shared with the  rugby team.

Achievements
NFD Champions:
2013–14

PSL promotion/relegation play-offs:
2011–12

Second Division National play-offs:
2010–11

Second Division Western Cape Stream:
2010–11

Metropolitan Under-19 Premier Cup
2012 (As Philippi United)

U-17 Engen Knockout Challenge
2015
2016

Club records

Premier Soccer League

2012–13 – 15th (relegated)
2014–15 – 14th
2015–16 – 6th
2016–17 – 13th
2017–18 – 10th
2018–19 – 12th
2019–20– 11th

National First Division
2011–12 – 2nd (promoted via play-off)
2013–14 – 1st (promoted)

Vodacom League
2009–10 – 13th (as Mbekweni Cosmos)
2010–11 – 1st (promoted via play-off)

Nedbank Cup
2011–12 – NFD qualification round
2012–13 – Round of 32
2013–14 – NFD qualification round
2014–15 – Round of 32
2015–16 – Round of 32

Telkom Knockout
2012 – Round of 16
2014 – Round of 16
2015 – Round of 16

MTN 8
2016 – Semi-finals*

PSL Reserve League
2014–15 – 6th (Group B)
2015–16 – 16th

Shirt sponsor & kit manufacturer

Club officials
Chairman:  Siviwe Mpengesi
CEO:  
COO:  Lukanyo Mzinzi
General manager:  Wandisile Mbenguzana

Coaching staff

Players

Internationals
Players who have made an appearance for national football team, while playing for Chippa United. Caps and period refer to the number of caps earned, and the period in which they are earned, while at Chippa United.

Former coaches
 Manqoba Mngqithi (July 9, 2012 – Aug 20, 2012)
 Julius Dube (Aug 23, 2012 – Sept 12, 2012)
 Roger Sikhakhane (Sept 13, 2012 – Oct 28, 2012)
 Farouk Abrahams (Oct 28, 2012 – Jan 29, 2013)
 Wilfred Mugeyi (Jan 29, 2013 – April 11, 2013)
 Mark Harrison (April 12, 2013 – Oct 7, 2013)
 Ian Palmer (Oct 8, 2013 – Jan 27, 2014)
 Vladislav Herić (Jan 29, 2014 – June 30, 2014)
 Kosta Papić (July 1, 2014 – Sept 3, 2014)
 Roger Sikhakhane (Sept 4, 2014 – Jan 5, 2015)
 Ernst Middendorp (Jan 5, 2015 – March 30, 2015)
 Roger Sikhakhane (July 2, 2015 – Dec 7, 2015)
 Dan Malesela (Dec , 2015 – Sept, 2017)
 Teboho Moloi (Sept 30, 2017 – Mar 3, 2018)
 Vladislav Herić (Mar 3, 2018 – May 27, 2018)
 Dan Malesela (May 27, 2018 – Aug 21, 2018)
 Lehlohonolo Seema ( – Dec 23, 2020)
 Luc Eymael (Dec 23, 2020 – Dec 24, 2020)
 Dan Malesela (Dec 27, 2020 – Apr 4, 2021)
 Gavin Hunt (Jul 7, 2021 – Jul 2022)

Former technical directors
 Mich d'Avray
 Vladislav Herić

References

External links
 
Premier Soccer League

 
Soccer clubs in South Africa
Association football clubs established in 2010
SAFA Second Division clubs
Premier Soccer League clubs
Soccer clubs in Cape Town
National First Division clubs
2010 establishments in South Africa